"Zenit" (Волейбольная команда «Зенит») is a Russian volleyball club based in Saint Petersburg.

The club is taking part in the Russian Superleague. The club's primary sponsor is Gazprom.

Achievements
Domestic competitions
Russian Championship
Runners-up (2):  2018, 2021
Russian Cup
Runners-up (3):  2018, 2019, 2020
Russian Super Cup
Runners-up (2):  2018, 2021

International competitions
  CEV Cup
Runner-up (1):  2021

History 
The VC Zenit was established in June 2017, as part of the FC Zenit. It played at the Super League for the first time in the 2017–18 season and finished fifth, and reached the Final game in playoff, against Zenit Kazan.

Team Roster
Team roster – season 2022/2023

References

External links

 
Russian volleyball clubs
Zenit Saint Petersburg
Volleyball clubs established in 2017
2017 establishments in Russia
Sports clubs in Saint Petersburg